The Operational Command South (OC South) is a formation of the Ukrainian Ground Forces in the southern part of Ukraine, which was formed in January 1998 as the Southern Operation Command on the basis of the Odesa Military District and headquartered in Odesa.

In 2005-2013 it was known as the Southern Operation Association.

Until 2015 Operational Command South covered 9 oblasts and autonomous republics: Odesa, Kirovohrad, Mykolaiv, Kherson, Dnipropetrovsk, Zaporizhzhia, Kharkiv, Luhansk, Donetsk oblasts and the Autonomous Republic of Crimea. In 2015 eastern parts of the operation command territory were passed on to newly formed Operation Command East based in Dnipro. The headquarters of the OC South was relocated from Odesa to Mykolaiv.

Composition
By 1 July 2006, the Southern Operational Command included 6th Army Corps (6 AK) and other units comprising:
 17th Armoured Brigade (Kryvyi Rih, Dnipropetrovsk Oblast)
 28th Guards Mechanised Brigade (Chornomorske, Odesa Oblast) reorganized as 28th Mechanized Infantry Brigade in 2015.
 92nd Mechanised Brigade Kluhoshyno-Bashkyrivka, Chuhuiv Raion, Kharkiv Oblast
 93rd Mechanised Brigade. Cherkaske Novomoskovsk Raion Dnipropetrovsk Oblast.
 55th Artillery Brigade (Zaporizhzhia)
 107th Rocket Launcher Regiment (Kremenchuk, Poltava Oblast)
 25th Airborne Brigade Hvardiiske Dnipropetrovsk Oblast
 79th Airmobile Brigade (Mykolaiv)
 11th Army Aviation Regiment (Chornobaivka, Kherson Oblast)
 1039th Anti-Aircraft Rocket Regiment (Hvardiiske, Dnipropetrovsk Oblast)
 3rd special purpose Regiment. Kropyvnytskyi
 50 Academic squad of special training. Kropyvnytskyi

Exercises that command units have taken part in include "Autumn-98", "reaction", "Southern redoubt-99", "Redoubt-2000", including peacekeeping – series of "Peace Shield", "Cossack Steppe," "common neighborhood", "Sea Breeze", "Fairway of Peace," "South," "cooperative partner" joint exercises with units of the armed forces of France and Italy.

Current structure 

Operational Command South has operational command of ground force units in Vinnytsia, Odesa, Mykolaiv, Kirovohrad, and Kherson oblasts.

 Operational Command South, Odesa
 28th Mechanized Brigade, Chornomorske
 56th Motorized Brigade, Melitopol
 57th Motorized Brigade, Kropyvnytskyi
 59th Motorized Brigade, Haisyn
 40th Artillery Brigade, Pervomaisk
 38th Anti-aircraft Missile Regiment, Nova Odesa
 7th Signal Regiment, Odesa
 16th Engineer Regiment, 
 145th Maintenance Regiment, 
 131st Reconnaissance Battalion, Hushchyntsi
 183rd Logistic Support Battalion, Balta
 225th Transport Battalion, Balta
 363rd Security & Service Battalion, Odesa
 91st Command & Intelligence Center, Krasnosilka
 64th Information & Signal Center, Odesa
 Regional Radioelectronic Intelligence (REI) Center, Krasnosilka
 78th REI Center, Balta
 79th REI Center, Reni
 82nd Maneuverable REI Center, Krasnosilka
 23rd Electronic Warfare Company

Additionally the following major ground combat formations of other branches of the Ukrainian Armed Forces, respectively the ground forces, are based in the area of Operational Command South:

 Ground Forces:
 11th Army Aviation Brigade, in Kherson
 Air Assault Forces:
 45th Air Assault Brigade, in Bolhrad
 79th Air Assault Brigade, in Mykolaiv
 81st Airmobile Brigade, in Kherson
 Naval Forces:
 36th Separate Marine Brigade, in Mykolaiv
 406th Coastal Artillery Brigade, in Mykolaiv
 32nd Rocket Artillery Regiment, in Altestove
 Air Forces:
 160th Anti-aircraft Missile Brigade, in Odesa
 208th Anti-aircraft Missile Brigade, in Kherson
 201st Anti-aircraft Missile Regiment, in Pervomaisk
 Special Forces:
 3rd Special Forces Regiment, in Kropyvnytskyi
 Territorial Defense Forces
 120th Territorial Defense Brigade
 121st Territorial Defense Brigade
 122nd Territorial Defense Brigade
 123rd Territorial Defense Brigade
 124th Territorial Defense Brigade

Leaders 
Colonel General Volodymyr Shkidchenko commanded the Odessa Military District from December 1993 until it became the Southern Operational Command in February 1998.

 February 1998 – September 1998, Colonel General Volodymyr Shkidchenko
 30 September 1998 – 19 December 2001, Colonel General Oleksandr Zatynaiko
 2001 – 2004, Lieutenant-General Volodymyr Mozharovsky
? November 2003 – July 2005, Lieutenant General Hryhoriy Pedchenko
 11 July 2005 – 25 June 2007, Lieutenant-General Ivan Svyda
 10 July 2007 – 10 May 2012, Lieutenant-General Petro Lytvyn further appointed commander 8th Army Corps (Ukraine) (Zhytomyr)
 Major General Ihor Fedorov (Acting) Chief of Staff
 2 July 2012 – Major General Anatoliy Sirotenko
 11 April 2015  Major General Andriy Hryshchenko

References

External links 
 Land Forces of Ukraine
 Southern Operational Command

Military units and formations of Ukraine
Military units and formations established in 1998
South
1998 establishments in Ukraine